Popular Agreement (IP) was a small political party in Italy led by Giampiero Catone.

History
Popular Agreement was founded in November 2012 by the deputy Giampiero Catone, member of the centre-right parliamentary group People and Territory. The party was born from the merger of 12 small political parties and associations: the clubs "La Discussione", the Democratic Alliance (Alleanza Democratica), the Christian Democracy – Third Pole of the Centre (Democrazia Cristiana – Terzo Polo di Centro), the Rebirth of Christian Democracy (Rinascita della Democrazia Cristiana), the Italian Christian Democrats (Cristiani Democratici Italiani), the Libertarian Right (Destra Libertaria), The Lotus (Il Loto), The Tulip (Il Tulipano), the Christian League (Lega Cristiana), the Italian Movement Young Europeans (Movimento Italiano Giovani Europei), the Party of the Land (Partito della Terra) and the Italian Catholic Pole (Polo Cattolico Italiano). The party was also joined by Giuseppe Trieste, that was appointed National President of the party, Vittorio Sgarbi (appointed spokesman) and Stefano Tacconi (appointed Deputy President).

Popular Agreement presented itself as the Catholic component of the centre-right coalition. The party participated in the general election of 2013 within the centre-right coalition led by Silvio Berlusconi, but it only received 0.08% of the vote and it didn't elect any MP.

References

Defunct political parties in Italy
Christian democratic parties in Italy
Defunct Christian political parties
Catholic political parties
Conservative parties in Italy
2012 establishments in Italy
2013 disestablishments in Italy
Political parties established in 2012
Political parties disestablished in 2013